The Siege of White Deer Park is the fifth book of The Animals of Farthing Wood series. It was first published in 1985 and has since been included in a single book with In the Path of the Storm and Battle for the Park in the "Second Omnibus" edition (Hutchinson, 1995).

Plot summary
Of the Farthing Wood animals Kestrel, Hare and Rabbit have died of old age, and as original Farthing Wood smaller animals have and have so many descendants with the animals native to White Deer Park the oath no longer applies to them.

The Farthing Wood animals' third winter in White Deer Park has come to an end. As spring arrives there is an influx of animals from outside the park. Fox suspects that something outside the park is driving these animals to take shelter in the park, so Tawny Owl and Whistler search outside the park for clues. They find nothing, but word starts to spread of a fierce beast making raids in the park during the night.

After searching the reserve and finding no sightings of the mysterious creature, Tawny Owl takes refuge in a tree in a small area of woodland within the park to rest. Before dawn he is awakened by the thought he is being watched. Looking down, he sees the head of a large creature with bright eyes looking at him in a menacing way. Knowing this is what he is looking for, Owl flies further up the tree out of reach, then notices the strange creature has disappeared in an instant. Owl then flies off to warn Fox and the others of his sighting just as the sun rises. Tawny Owl gives Fox a description of what he saw. Adder also hears of these developments. Though Adder says nothing, Fox thinks Adder is hiding something.

Later Adder finds Toad and asks him about some large paw prints he has found near the now deserted Edible Frog's pond. Adder explains that as he does not have paws he cannot judge whether they are from a toad or not. Toad tells him these prints are too big for a toad. A meeting is called and Toad informs the animals of the footprints seen by himself and Adder. Badger states that the graceful nature of this animal reminds him of the Warden's cat and suggests that the animal might be a sort of cat. Tawny Owl pooh-poohs this suggestion. Not long afterwards meeting the Beast kills one of the white deer herd and Friendly discovers the carcass, then talks to some of his younger relatives about his plan to track the creature down.

The Beast kills a white deer fawn and leaves few remains as evidence, so Friendly and the other foxes do not notice what has happened. The Warden does notice the losses and regularly patrols the area with a gun, but the Beast is not discovered. While fishing Whistler spots the Beast when it drinks from the stream, and sees that it is a very large cat. He tells Adder, who notices that the footprints are the same ones that he had seen before, and he decides to pursue the cat with the idea of poisoning it. However, the Beast traps Adder with its paw and toys with him, eventually knocking him into the stream which allows him to escape.

Whistler tells Fox and Vixen of the creature he has seen and Weasel heads off to tell Badger the news. He arrives at Badger's set and discovers Badger talking to a young mole named Mossy, who is trying to tell Badger that Mole is his father. As Badger is unable to accept that Mole is dead Weasel asks Mossy to pretend to be Mole for Badger's sake. He then tells the other animals, who agree to go along with this idea.

As the vixens are looking after their cubs Friendly gathers a group of male foxes - made up of Pace (Friendly's son), Husky (Bold's son), Ranger (Charmer's mate), Rusty (Ranger's son), and Trip (Ranger's son) - to join him on an expedition to search out the Beast. They head to the stream where the creature was seen by Whistler and follow its trail into an area of woodland. Friendly notices something stir in the undergrowth and heads off after it, but he is unable to stay on its trail. Initially the foxes wait for the Beast to return but Friendly lets the young foxes look for food, and they come across another young deer which was killed by the Beast. They feed off the remains of the carcass and head back, but the Beast watches them from a tree as they do so.

Meanwhile, Adder comes across a female adder and tries to impress her with the story of his attack by the Beast, but she shows no interest in him and Adder slides away from her. Adder later tries to find the female adder but is unable to. The next day Whistler discovers that the Warden is setting up a pen by the perimeter of the reserve, and when Tawny Owl tells the animals that the deer are being rounded up they realise that the humans have decided to watch over them to keep them safe. The Beast also realises what the Warden is doing and decides to bide its time so the Warden will think it has left the Park.

That evening Friendly and his group of foxes go in search of the Beast again, and its trail leads them to a small copse. Ranger thinks it is a trap but Friendly insists they go on. They enter cautiously but the Beast leaps down from a tree and grabs Husky in its jaws, before leaping back up carrying the young fox. The other foxes realise they are powerless against such a huge animal and leave to fetch help. Once they are gone the Beast drops Husky to the ground. Friendly and the young foxes look for Fox and Vixen, but they find Badger instead and tell him what has happened. Fox and Vixen soon return and Badger decides to offer himself to the Beast in exchange for Husky. He heads off but the foxes leave soon afterwards and reach the copse before him, only to discover that Husky is dead, and the Beast is long gone.

Fox comes up with a plan and instructs the other animals to spread the word across the park that every inhabitant of the reserve must keep a lookout for clues and report anything they see immediately. The Warden realises that his attempt to lure the Beast has been unsuccessful and releases the deer back into the reserve. Later Adder comes across the female adder again, and she tells him that she has seen the Beast use a large hole in the bank by the stream. Adder finds this hole, then finds Whistler and tells him this information. Whistler immediately flies away to inform Fox, who decides to gather all the park's inhabitants together and try to trap the Beast in its lair.

That evening all the animals have gathered together and they head towards the stream. They find the hole and Toad volunteers to search it for the Beast. He goes inside and discovers the creature sleeping inside, and Fox looks on the other side for another exit. However the Beast wakes up and leaves its lair, causing the group of animals to pull back in terror and watch as the cat washes itself, showing no interest at all in its audience. Eventually the cat takes a few laps from the stream and bounds away out of sight, as the animals can only watch, powerless to stop it.

Most of the animals disperse, but Tawny Owl pursues the Beast through the air, eventually finding the large cat in a ditch near the perimeter of the reserve. Annoyed at being discovered, The Beast asks about Tawny Owl's interest in it, and Owl tells it how terrified all the park's inhabitants are of it. He asks the cat whether it could hunt somewhere else instead and it refuses, but it makes a pledge that no animal will ever see it again although it will still be around, and promises to leave the park if any creature should set eyes on it and tell it so.

Tawny Owl decides to go tell all the animals about how he has spoken to the Beast, but being very tired he decides to sleep first. Now that the deer are back the Beast kills two more deer and stores them until the park's inhabitants have let their guard down. The Warden lays traps for the Beast, but it does not go near them and the Warden eventually decides to remove them. The Beast then goes on a rampage in Farthing Wood territory, killing several of the smaller creatures and nearly killing Leveret, but he escapes and his mate is killed instead.

Adder meets the female adder again and she tells him that she would like to be known as Sinuous. They sunbathe together and Sinuous suggests that the Beast may be living underground. Adder immediately tells Badger and Fox about this theory, and all the foxes, badgers, weasels and rabbits in the park are asked whether they know of a large underground lair, but none do. Badger tells Mossy about the theory and Mossy informs him of a large underground chamber that Mirthful had come across before she died. Badger asks Mossy to find the chamber and inform him if the Beast is living there so that Badger can spot the cat and force it to leave.

Mossy starts his search, but he gets distracted by worms and loses focus. However, he eventually falls into a large chamber and discovers that the Beast is sleeping inside. He tries to leave quickly but the Beast wakes up and pursues him. Mossy digs underground but the Beast digs after him until Tawny Owl shouts out that he has seen the cat and asks him to yield. The cat roars loudly and Badger arrives, asking the Beast to take him instead of Mossy. The Beast tells the animals he could easily slay them all, but just then they all hear the loud cry of another cat in the distance. The two cats call to each other and the Beast rushes out of the park to join the female that was calling to him. The animals realize that spring must be the mating season for the Beast and celebrate that the Beast has finally left the park.

Reception
This proved to be the poorest received of all the Farthing Wood series, possibly because it is only resolved in the end by a deus ex machina – unlike the other books where the animals work together to overcome their problems.

TV series
The main plot of this book is not covered in the television series possibly due to its extreme peril themes being too frightening for younger audiences. However, the sub-plot featuring Badger mistaking Mossy for his dead father Mole was included in the second season, while Adder meeting Sinuous was included in the third season.

References

1985 British novels
1985 fantasy novels
Animals of Farthing Wood books
Children's fantasy novels
Hutchinson (publisher) books
1985 children's books